Warner Hahn (born 15 June 1992) is a professional footballer who plays as a goalkeeper for Kyoto Sanga. He formerly played for FC Dordrecht, Feyenoord, PEC Zwolle, Excelsior, Anderlecht, Go Ahead Eagles and IFK Göteborg. Born in the Netherlands, he represents the Suriname national team.

Club career
Hahn joined Go Ahead Eagles in the Netherlands for 2021–22 season and made his debut in a 1–0 loss against Heerenveen on 13 August 2021. On 28 August, Hahn kept his first clean sheet for the club in a 2–0 win against Sparta Rotterdam. On 29 January 2022, Hahn and Go Ahead Eagles mutually agreed to terminate his contract. 

On 9 February 2022, he joined Allsvenskan club IFK Göteborg on a one-year contract. At the end of the season, the team announced they would not be renewing Hahn's contract.

On 7 January 2023, Hahn announcement officially signing transfer to J1 club, Kyoto Sanga for upcoming 2023 season.

International career 
Born in the Netherlands, Hahn is of Surinamese descent. In March 2021, he has been called up to the national squad of Suriname by coach Dean Gorré after receiving the green light from FIFA to call-up Dutch origin players including several that currently play in the Netherlands. He made his debut on 24 March 2021 in a World Cup qualifier against the Cayman Islands. In June 2021, Hahn was named to Suriname's 23-man squad for the 2021 CONCACAF Gold Cup.

Career statistics

International

References

External links
 
 Voetbal International profile 
 Netherlands U21 stats at OnsOranje 

1992 births
Living people
Footballers from Rotterdam
Surinamese footballers
Suriname international footballers
Dutch footballers
Netherlands under-21 international footballers
Netherlands youth international footballers
Dutch sportspeople of Surinamese descent
Association football goalkeepers
FC Dordrecht players
Feyenoord players
PEC Zwolle players
Excelsior Rotterdam players
SC Heerenveen players
R.S.C. Anderlecht players
Go Ahead Eagles players
IFK Göteborg players
Kyoto Sanga FC players
Eredivisie players
Eerste Divisie players
Belgian Pro League players
Allsvenskan players
J1 League players
Surinamese expatriate footballers
Dutch expatriate footballers
Expatriate footballers in Belgium
Expatriate footballers in Sweden
Surinamese expatriate sportspeople in Belgium
Surinamese expatriate sportspeople in Sweden
2021 CONCACAF Gold Cup players